Sayyid Ahmad Musavi Hindi (1800–1869) was a Twelver Shia cleric. He was the paternal grandfather of the supreme leader of the Islamic republic of Iran, Ruhollah Khomeini.

Biography

India
His family migrated towards the end of the 18th century from Nishapur in Iran to Oudh in northern India. They settled in the town of Kintoor, Barabanki district. Zayn al-'Abidin al-Musavi, who was progenitor of sayeds of Kintoor, was great-great-grandfather of Seyyed Ahmad. He was born in Kintoor.

Iraq
In about 1830 he permanently left India, initially on a pilgrimage to the tomb of Ali in Najaf, Iraq. According to Moin, this movement was to escape colonial rule.

Iran
He visited Iran in 1834 and bought a house in Khomeyn. He later purchased more land in and around Khomeyn, including an orchard and caravanserai. These properties remained in the family up to modern times.

By 1841 he had married three wives: Shirin Khanum, Bibi Khanum, and Sakineh (his friend Yusuf Khan Kamareh'i's sister), all from Khomeyn. He had five children, including a son named Mostafa (father of Ruhollah Khomeini), who was born in 1856 from Sakineh.

Death
He died in 1869 and was buried in Karbala.

The Hindi nisba (title)
He continued to be known by the nisba (title) Hindi (i.e. from Hind or India), indicating his stay there. Even Ruhollah Khomeini used Hindi as a pen name in some of his ghazals. Ruhollah Khomeini's brother was known by name Nureddin Hindi.

References

1869 deaths
Iranian Shia clerics
Iranian Shia scholars of Islam
People from Nishapur
19th-century Muslim scholars of Islam
Iranian expatriates in India
People from Barabanki, Uttar Pradesh
Ruhollah Khomeini
Scholars from Lucknow
Al-Moussawi family
Year of birth unknown
Indian people of Iranian descent
19th-century Indian Muslims
Indian Shia clerics